111 Herculis is a suspected astrometric binary star system located 92 light years from the Sun in the northern constellation Hercules. It is visible to the naked eye as a faint, white-hued point of light with an apparent visual magnitude of 4.34.

According to Cowley et al. (1969), the visible component has a stellar classification of A5III, matching an A-type giant star. Abt and Morrell (1995) listed it as type A3IV, suggesting it is instead a less evolved subgiant star. The star is estimated to be 559 million years old with 2.40 times the mass of the Sun and is spinning with a projected rotational velocity of 71 km/s. It is radiating 13 times the Sun's luminosity from its photosphere at an effective temperature of 8,873 K.

References

A-type giants
A-type subgiants
Astrometric binaries
Hercules (constellation)
Durchmusterung objects
Herculis, 111
173880
092161
7069